Tim Golds (born 6 April 1993) is a former professional Australian rules footballer who played for the Greater Western Sydney Giants in the Australian Football League (AFL). He was also listed with the Collingwood Football Club in 2016, but did not play a senior match. He was recruited by the Greater Western Sydney Giants as an underage selection at the age of 17. Golds made his debut for the Giants in round 20, 2012, against  at Carrara Stadium. He was delisted by the Giants in October 2015.

Golds first came to public prominence in the drawn Grand Final in 2010. Wearing a "Team GWS" jumper, Golds finished in second place in the Grand Final sprint race at half time behind St Kilda's Luke Miles.

In November 2015, Golds was recruited by Collingwood through the rookie draft. Golds played every game of the 2016 VFL season, but he wasn't able to secure a single senior game and he was delisted at the end of the season.

Statistics

|- style="background-color: #EAEAEA"
! scope="row" style="text-align:center" | 2012
|
| 15 || 2 || 0 || 0 || 10 || 8 || 18 || 4 || 1 || 0.0 || 0.0 || 5.0 || 4.0 || 9.0 || 2.0 || 0.5
|-
! scope="row" style="text-align:center" | 2013
|
| 15 || 1 || 0 || 0 || 5 || 4 || 9 || 3 || 2 || 0.0 || 0.0 || 5.0 || 4.0 || 9.0 || 3.0 || 2.0
|- style="background-color: #EAEAEA"
! scope="row" style="text-align:center" | 2014
|
| 15 || 3 || 0 || 0 || 15 || 12 || 27 || 7 || 2 || 0.0 || 0.0 || 5.0 || 4.0 || 9.0 || 2.3 || 0.7
|-
! scope="row" style="text-align:center" | 2015
|
| 15 || 0 || — || — || — || — || — || — || — || — || — || — || — || — || — || —
|- style="background-color: #EAEAEA"
! scope="row" style="text-align:center" | 2016
|
| 41 || 0 || — || — || — || — || — || — || — || — || — || — || — || — || — || —
|- class="sortbottom"
! colspan=3| Career
! 6
! 0
! 0
! 30
! 24
! 54
! 14
! 5
! 0.0
! 0.0
! 5.0
! 4.0
! 9.0
! 2.3
! 0.8
|}

References

External links

1993 births
Living people
Greater Western Sydney Giants players
Australian rules footballers from Victoria (Australia)
Oakleigh Chargers players